Recess (Irish: Sraith Saileach or Sraith Salach) is a village in County Galway, Ireland. Its official name is in Irish, Sraith Saileach, and translates as "stream of the willow tree". A notable former resident was Seán Lester, the last Secretary General of the League of Nations, who lived there following his retirement until his death in 1959.

Transport
Recess railway station was on the Galway-Clifden line of the Midland Great Western Railway. The line opened on 1 July 1895 and was closed on 29 April 1935. The railway owned a hotel at Recess which on 13 October 1922 was burned down by Republicans (together with nearby Glendalough House) to prevent the National troops from using them as billets.

Name
The name in the Irish language is Sruth meaning stream and Saileach meaning Sally tree. The name stone on entering the village is incorrectly spelled which gives another meaning.

See also
 List of towns and villages in Ireland
 Lissoughter

References

External links
Recess at Connemara Ireland

Towns and villages in County Galway
Gaeltacht places in County Galway
Gaeltacht towns and villages
Articles on towns and villages in Ireland possibly missing Irish place names